Campana or Campaña (Spanish for "campaign" or occasionally "countryside") is a surname. Notable people with the surname include:
 Al Campana (1926–2009), American National Football League running back
 Alex Campana (born 1988), English footballer
 Cosetta Campana (born 1961), Italian former sprinter
 Dino Campana (1885–1932), Italian poet
 Fabio Campana (1819–1882), Italian composer, opera director, conductor and singing teacher
 Fernando Campana (born 1961), half of the Campana brothers, Brazilian designers
 Francesca Campana ( – 1665), Roman singer, spinet player and composer
 Francesco Federico or François Frédéric Campana (1771–1807), Italian general in Napoleon's army
 Giacinto Campana (born ), Italian painter of the Baroque period
 Giampietro Campana (1808–1880), Italian art collector and embezzler
 Giorgia Campana (born 1995), Italian artistic gymnast
 Héctor Campana (born 1964), Argentine former basketball player and former vice-governor of Córdoba Province
 Humberto Campana (born 1953), half of the Campana brothers, Brazilian designers
 José Campaña (born 1993), Spanish footballer
 Loris Campana (1926–2015), Italian road bicycle and track cyclist
 Martín Campaña (born 1989), Uruguayan footballer
 Pablo Campana (born 1972), Ecuadorian former tennis player
 Pedro Campaña (1503–1586), Flemish painter of the Renaissance period
 Pedro Delgado Campaña (fl. 2010s), former Governor of the Central Bank of Ecuador
 Pierre Campana (born 1985), French rally driver
 Pietro Campana (1727–1765), Spanish engraver
 Sergio Campana (footballer) (born 1934), Italian lawyer and former professional footballer
 Sergio Campana (racing driver) (born 1986), Italian racing driver
 Thomas J. Campana Jr. (1947–2004), American inventor
 Tom Campana (born 1950), American former football player in the Canadian Football League
 Tommaso Campana (fl. 1620–1640), Italian painter active during the Baroque period
 Tony Campana (born 1986), American Major League Baseball outfielder